In the Name of Love is a 2012 Vietnamese thriller film directed by Luu Huynh.

Cast
 Thai Hoa
 Huy Khanh as Khanh
 Dinh Y. Nhung as Nhung

References

External links
 

2012 films
2012 thriller films
Vietnamese-language films
Vietnamese thriller films